Sam McCarthy is a New Zealand songwriter and pop vocalist. He is best known for his work in Kids of 88 and Goodnight Nurse.

Early life

McCarthy was brought up in Auckland in the suburb of Weymouth. He was educated at Weymouth Primary School and St Peter's College. He and Jordan Arts met at St Peter's and quickly realised that they were on the same wavelength. They were in the same English class.

McCarthy has said:  "As an icebreaking exercise we were told to bring in our favourite song. Everyone brought in Limp Bizkit, but the thing that linked Jordan and myself is that we were wanky enough to bring in Jimi Hendrix songs. We were both trying to be as cool as possible so we rummaged through our parents' CD collection as opposed to our own".

With Jordan Arts, David Wong, Graham Scherer and Michael Pomare, McCarthy was a member of "Incursa", a St Peter's College band which won the Smokefreerockquest in 2004.

Career

Members from Incursa went on to form punk icons False Start and Goodnight Nurse, which McCarthy still belongs to as a guitarist. Arts and McCarthy then formed Kids of 88. In releasing the first Kids of 88 album, Sugarpills, McCarthy said that the duo tried to produce a variety of material rather than just the familiarly slutty "My House" and "Just A Little Bit" (released earlier as singles). Their style is broadly a fusion of electropop and 1980's style dance music. They describe it as "a cross between a late 80's police drama intro theme and a sophisticated super hussy". A reviewer has said "while reminiscent of early 80s synthpop, they aren't a direct copy of their antecedents. There's also a touch of 2010 punk swagger and adrenaline, where dance can't ignore what's been achieved in R&B and hip-hop". McCarthy and Arts produced the album themselves and worked with a simple technical set-up out of a bedroom. At the 2010 New Zealand Music Awards, Kids of 88 won "Single of the Year" and (with Tim Van Dammen) "Music Video of the Year" for their single Just a Little Bit.

In 2013, McCarthy wrote and recorded "Don't Let Me Go" with Harry Styles, from One Direction.

In 2016, McCarthy began recording electropop music under the pseudonym BOYBOY. He released three songs, "Boy", "None of Your Love" and VIces".

Discography

Albums

With Goodnight Nurse 

 Always and Never (2006) Festival
 Keep Me on Your Side (2008) Warner

With Kids of 88 

 Sugarpills (2010) Dryden Street/Sony Music
 Modern Love (2012) Dryden Street/Sony Music

Singles

With Incursa 
 "Find Out" (2004)

Awards and nominations 

|-
| 2006
| Goodnight Nurse
| New Zealand Music Awards – People's Choice Award
| 
|-
| 2009
| Kids of 88/"My House"
| New Zealand Music Awards – Single of the Year
| 
|-
| rowspan="2" | 2010
| Kids of 88/"Just a Little Bit"
| New Zealand Music Awards – Single of the Year
| 
|-
| Kids of 88
| New Zealand Music Awards – People's Choice Award
| 
|}

References
 

   

1988 births
Living people
New Zealand rock musicians
New Zealand male guitarists
New Zealand pop singers
New Zealand male singer-songwriters
People from Auckland
People educated at St Peter's College, Auckland
21st-century New Zealand male singers
21st-century guitarists